Bani Ali is a sub-district located in Mudhaykhirah District, Ibb Governorate, Yemen. Bani Ali had a population of 4,889 according to the 2004 census.

References 

Sub-districts in Mudhaykhirah District